Carpinus caroliniana, the  American hornbeam, is a small hardwood tree in the genus Carpinus. American hornbeam is also known as blue-beech, ironwood, musclewood and muscle beech. It is native to eastern North America, from Minnesota and southern Ontario east to Maine, and south to eastern Texas and northern Florida. It also grows in Canada (southwest Quebec and southeast Ontario). It occurs naturally in shaded areas with moist soil, particularly near the banks of streams or rivers, and is often a natural constituent understory species of the riverine and maritime forests of eastern temperate North America.

Description

The bark is smooth and greenish-grey, becoming shallowly fissured in all old trees. The male and female catkins appear in spring at the same time as the leaves. The seeds often do not germinate till the spring of the second year after maturating.

 Bark: On old trees near the base, furrowed.  Young trees and branches smooth, dark bluish gray, sometimes furrowed, light and dark gray.  Branchlets at first pale green, changing to reddish brown, ultimately dull gray.
 Wood: Light brown, sapwood nearly white; heavy, hard, close-grained, very strong.  Used for levers, handles of tools.  Specific gravity, 0.7286; density .
Inner scales enlarge when spring growth begins. No terminal bud is formed.
 Leaves: Alternate, two to four inches long, ovate-oblong, rounded, wedge-shaped, or rarely subcordate and often unequal at base, sharply and doubly serrate, acute or acuminate.  They come out of the bud pale bronze green and hairy; when full grown they are dull deep green above, paler beneath; feather-veined, midrib and veins very prominent on under side.  In autumn bright red, deep scarlet and orange. Petioles short, slender, hairy.  Stipules caducous.
 Flowers: April. Monœcious, without petals, the staminate spike naked in pendulous catkins (aments). The staminate ament buds are axillary and form in the autumn. During the winter they resemble leaf-buds, only twice as large. The staminate flower is composed of three to twenty stamens crowded on a hairy torus, adnate to the base of a broadly ovate, acute boot-shaped scale, green below the middle, bright red at apex. The pistillate aments are one-half to three-fourths of an inch long with ovate, acute, hairy, green scales and bright scarlet styles.
 Fruit: Clusters of involucres, hanging from the ends of leafy branches.  Each involucre slightly encloses a small oval nut.  The involucres are short stalked, usually three-lobed, though one lobe is often wanting; halberd-shaped, coarsely serrated on one margin, or entire.

Subdivisions
There are two subspecies, which intergrade extensively where they meet:
Carpinus caroliniana subsp. caroliniana. Atlantic coastal plain north to Delaware, and lower Mississippi Valley west to eastern Texas.
Carpinus caroliniana subsp. virginiana. Appalachian Mountains and west to Minnesota and south to Arkansas.

Ecology

They are shade-loving trees, preferring moderate soil fertility and moisture. It has a shallow, wide-spreading root system. The leaves are eaten by the caterpillars of some Lepidoptera, for example the Io moth (Automeris io).

Common along the borders of streams and swamps, loves a deep moist soil.  Varies from shrub to small tree, and ranges throughout the United States east of the Rocky Mountains.

Deer browse the foliage and twigs, while game birds eat the nutlets.

Uses
The wood is heavy and hard, and is used for tool handles, longbows, walking sticks, walking canes and golf clubs.

References

caroliniana
Trees of Eastern Canada
Trees of the Eastern United States
Flora of the North-Central United States
Flora of the Northeastern United States
Flora of the South-Central United States
Trees of the Great Lakes region (North America)
Flora of the Southeastern United States
Trees of humid continental climate
Plants described in 1788
Trees of Mexico
Trees of Central America
Trees of North America
Trees of the Southern United States
Trees of the United States
Trees of Canada